This is a list of notable people from Ankara, Turkey.

Musicians and music bands
 Mazhar Alanson
 Funda Arar
 İdil Biret
 Çilekeş
 Hande Dalkılıç
 Ayşedeniz Gökçin
 Nil Karaibrahimgil
 maNga
 Peter Murphy
 Erkan Oğur
 Zerrin Özer
 Yağmur Sarıgül
 Fazıl Say
 Joe Strummer
 Özlem Tekin

Others
 Boran Kuzum, actor
 Filiz Akın, actress
 Ekrem Bora, actor
 Emin Çölaşan, journalist
 Burak Dakak, actor
 Yasemin Dalkılıç, free diver
 Vedat Dalokay, architect
 Ordal Demokan, physicist
 Cansu Dere, actress
 Can Dündar, journalist
 Burak Sergen, actor
 Melih Gokcek, mayor
 Erdal İnönü, politician and physicist
 Orhan Karaveli, journalist and writer
 Vehbi Koç, pioneer industrialist
 Kartal Tibet, actor
 Tunc Ucyildiz, surfer

See also
 

people
 
Ankara